A statue of Charles Sumner (sometimes called Charles Sumner) by Thomas Ball is installed in Boston's Public Garden, in the U.S. state of Massachusetts.

Description and history
The bronze sculpture was commissioned during 1876–1877, and dedicated on December 23, 1878. It was surveyed as part of the Smithsonian Institution's "Save Outdoor Sculpture!" program in 1993.

See also

 Statue of Charles Sumner (Cambridge, Massachusetts)

References

External links
 

1877 sculptures
1878 establishments in Massachusetts
Boston Public Garden
Bronze sculptures in Massachusetts
Monuments and memorials in Boston
Outdoor sculptures in Boston
Sculptures of men in Massachusetts
Statues in Boston